Vikram Batra  (9 September 1974 – 7 July 1999) was an officer of the Indian Army. He was posthumously awarded the Param Vir Chakra, the highest Indian military decoration, for his actions during the Kargil War; on 7 July 1999, Batra was killed while fighting Pakistani troops around Area Ledge, Point 4875, in the Kargil district of erstwhile Jammu and Kashmir.

Early life and education
Batra was born on 9 September 1974, in a small town in Palampur, Himachal Pradesh. He was the third child of Girdhari Lal Batra, a government school principal, and Kamal Kanta Batra, a school teacher. He was the elder of twin sons, born fourteen minutes before his brother, Vishal. The twins were nicknamed: 'Luv' (Vikram) and 'Kush' (Vishal), after the twin sons of the Hindu deity Rama, by their mother who was a professed devotee of Rama. He had two sisters: Seema and Nutan. As a young child, Batra received his primary education under the tutelage of his mother. He then attended the D.A.V. Public School in Palampur, where he studied up to middle standard. He received his senior secondary education at Central School in Palampur. 

Besides his academic endeavours, Batra also dabbled in a variety of sports at his school, which he represented at the national level during the Youth Parliamentary competitions in Delhi. He also represented his school and college in table tennis, Karate and other such sports. In 1990, he and his twin brother represented their school in table tennis at All India KVS Nationals. He also was a green belt holder in Karate and went on to attend a national level camp in Manali.

After completing his Class XII board examinations in 1992 from Central School, he attended DAV College, Chandigarh in B.Sc Medical Sciences. At college, he joined the Air Wing of the National Cadet Corps (NCC) while he was in his first year. During the Inter-State NCC Camp, he was adjudged the best NCC Air Wing cadet of Punjab Directorate in North Zone. He was selected and underwent a 40-day paratrooping training with his NCC Air Wing unit at Pinjore Airfield and Flying Club, about 35 kilometres away from Chandigarh. During the next two years in DAV, he remained a cadet of the Army Wing of NCC. In addition, he was the president of the Youth Service Club of his college.

He afterward qualified for the 'C' certificate in the NCC and attained the rank of Senior Under Officer in his NCC unit. Subsequently, in 1994, he was selected and took part in the Republic Day parade as an NCC cadet, and when he came back home, he told his parents that he wanted to join the Army. His maternal grandfather was also a soldier in the Indian Army. In 1995, while still in college, he was selected for the merchant navy at a shipping company headquartered in Hong Kong, but ultimately he changed his mind, aspiring to do "something great, something extraordinary, which may bring fame to my country." That same year he completed his bachelor's degree, graduating from the DAV College in Chandigarh.

Following completion of his bachelor's degree in 1995, he enrolled at Panjab University in Chandigarh, where he took admission in MA English course, so that he could prepare for the Combined Defence Services (CDS) Examination. He attended evening classes at the University and worked part-time in the morning as a branch manager of a travelling agency in Chandigarh.

In 1996, he passed the CDS examination and subsequently received a call for an interview at the Services Selection Board (SSB) at Allahabad and was selected. He was among the top 35 candidates in the Order of Merit. After completing a year (session 1995—96) towards the degree of MA in English, he left the University to join the Indian Military Academy.

Military career 

Batra joined the Indian Military Academy (IMA) at Dehradun, in June 1996 in the Manekshaw Battalion. After completing his 19-month training course, he graduated from the IMA on 6 December 1997 and was commissioned as a lieutenant into the Indian Army. He was commissioned into the 13th battalion of the Jammu and Kashmir Rifles (13 JAK Rif). After commissioning, he was sent to Jabalpur, Madhya Pradesh for regimental training. The training lasted one month, from December 1997 to the end of January 1998.

On completion of this training he got his first posting at Sopore in Baramulla district of Jammu and Kashmir, an area with significant militant activity. In mid-March 1998, he was sent to the Infantry School at Mhow, Madhya Pradesh, where young Army officers are trained, for the Young Officer's Course. This training lasted five months until September 1998. Following completion of the course and being awarded alpha grading, he joined his battalion in Sopore in October 1998.

During his posting in Sopore, Batra had several encounters with militants. In one of those encounters when Batra was leading an ambush with his platoon into an area of dense forest, he escaped when bullet fired by a militant grazed his shoulder and struck one of Batra's men behind him, who was killed. Batra ordered his men to fire on the militants, and by morning all of the militants were killed. He believed that the bullet was meant for him and not his colleague.

In January 1999, Batra was sent on a Commando Course at Belgaum, Karnataka. The course lasted for two months and at the end of it, he was awarded the highest grading — the Instructor's Grade.

Every time when he came home to Palampur on leave, he would visit the Neugal Cafe. Batra last came home on leave from the army in 1999, during the Holi festival for a few days.

After his leave, he returned to join his battalion in Sopore. The 13 JAK Rif, after completing its counter-insurgency operations tenure in Kashmir under 192 Mountain Brigade of 8 Mountain Division, received orders to proceed to Shahjahanpur, Uttar Pradesh. The battalion's advance party under Major Yogesh Kumar Joshi had reached its destination, when on 5 June, because of the outbreak of the war, its deployment orders were changed and the battalion received orders to move to Dras.

Batra informed his parents about his movement and assured them they need not worry about him. He would call his parents at least once in ten days. The last phone call he made was on 29 June 1999. This was the last time that Batra spoke to his mother.

Beginning his service as a lieutenant, he rose to the rank of Captain.

Kargil War 

Batra's battalion, the 13 Jammu and Kashmir Rifles (13 JAK Rif), reached Dras on 6 June, was placed under the command of 56 Mountain Brigade, and was given orders to act as reserves to the 2nd battalion of the Rajputana Rifles (2 Raj Rif) during their attack on Tololing mountain. The 18th battalion of The Grenadiers (18 Grenadiers) first attacked Tololing on 22 May, but were unable to capture the peak. 18 Grenadiers made four attempts to capture Tololing, but could only succeed in securing the lower slopes, while suffering heavy casualties. Eventually, 2 Raj Rif was assigned the mission of capturing Tololing and they did so on 13 June 1999.

After the capture of Tololing, 13 JAK Rif marched from Dras to Tololing, reaching their destination in 12 hours. Upon reaching, Alpha company of 13 JAK Rif took over Tololing and a portion of the Hump Complex from 18 Grenadiers.

Capture of Point 5140
The task of capturing Point 5140, a strategically important mountain peak in the Dras sector, was assigned to 13 JAK Rif under the command of Lieutenant Colonel Yogesh Kumar Joshi on 17 June 1999. After the capture of Rocky Knob, located at the base of Point 5140 and about 800 metres away, Humps IX and X (part of Hump Complex, consisting of about ten high grounds numbered I to X on the same ridgeline about 500–700 metres north of Point 4590) on 17 June, the battalion's commanding officer, Joshi, fell back to Tololing, and started planning for their next objective — Point 5140. Point 5140, about 1500 metres north of Tololing on the same ridgeline, is at an altitude of 16,962 feet above sea level and overlooks the Tololing nullah. It is the highest point on the Tololing ridgeline and the most formidable feature in the Dras sub-sector.

On 18 June, the battalion carried out a detailed reconnaissance of Point 5140 which revealed the enemy had put in place seven sangars on the feature; two on the top, four towards the east and one towards the north. It also revealed the eastern approach to the feature was comparatively easier than that from the front, which had a near vertical climb, dominated by the top, though it was also more heavily defended. It was decided the assaulting troops must capture the Top before dawn, or else the enemy would inflict maximum casualties on them.

Joshi decided to attack Point 5140 with Bravo Company, under the command of Lieutenant Sanjeev Singh Jamwal, and Delta Company, under the command of Lieutenant Vikram Batra, from two sides; East and South. At the Hump Complex, the two officers, Jamwal and Batra, received their briefing about the mission from Joshi. During the briefing, Jamwal chose the words "Oh! Yeah, yeah, yeah!" to be the success signal for his company whilst Batra chose the words "Yeh Dil Mange More!" (This heart wants more! — from a popular advertising slogan of Pepsi) as his success signal for his company. D-Day was set for 19 June, and H-Hour at 20:30.

Under the cover of artillery fire, the two assault companies began climbing Point 5140 after midnight on 20 June. The artillery at Hump Complex had already begun its preparatory bombardment of Point 5140. As planned, the artillery guns would stop firing when the troops were 200 metres short of the objective.

Once the artillery guns, including the MBRLs and 105 mm guns, had ceased firing, the Pakistani soldiers immediately came out of their bunkers and put down heavy fire with their machine guns on the advancing Indian soldiers. At that moment, both Jamwal and Batra, contacted commanders at the base via radio, asking to continue artillery bombardment of the enemy positions till the companies were 100 metres from their target.

By 0315 hours, both B and D Companies had reached the vicinity of Point 5140 despite the treacherous terrain. B company reached the top of the feature first and assaulted from the left flank. By 0330 hours, B company had captured its objective, and at 0335 hours Jamwal radioed his command post, saying the words "Oh! Yeah, yeah, yeah!"

Batra decided to approach the hill from the rear, aiming to surprise the enemy, and to cut off their withdrawal route. Batra fired three rockets towards the bunkers on the east side of the feature, before attacking them. He and his men ascended the sheer rock-cliff, but as the group neared the top, the enemy pinned them on the face of the bare cliff with machine gun fire. Batra, along with five of his men, climbed up and after reaching the top, hurled two grenades at the machine gun post. Batra then killed three enemy soldiers single-handedly in close combat. He was seriously injured in the process, but insisted on regrouping his men to continue with the mission. He continued to lead his troops, and then charged at the next enemy position, capturing Point 5140. In all its actions, his company killed at least eight Pakistani intruders and recovered a heavy anti-aircraft machine gun. The remaining enemy soldiers fled.

At 0435 hours, Batra radioed his command post, saying the words "Yeh dil mange more!". Considerable quantities of arms and ammunition were recovered from the feature. The captured munitions indicated the enemy's strength was about a platoon. Neither B or D companies suffered any casualties in the battle. The capture of Point 5140 set in motion a string of successes, such as the captures of Point 5100, Point 4700, Junction Peak and the Three Pimple Complex.

After the capture of Point 5140, Batra was promoted to the rank of captain. General Ved Prakash Malik, the then Chief of Army Staff, called to congratulate him. All across the nation, his triumph was being played out on television screens.

On 26 June, shortly after the capture of Point 5140, 13 JAK Rif was ordered to move from Dras to Ghumri to rest, refit, and recoup. The battalion then moved to Mushkoh Valley on 30 June.

Capture of Point 4875
Upon reaching Mushkoh Valley, the 13 JAK Rifles was placed under the command of 79 Mountain Brigade. The next assignment for Batra's battalion was to capture the Point 4875, a strategically important peak located in the Mushkoh Valley. Since the feature dominated the National Highway 1 completely from Dras to Matayan, it became imperative for the Indian Army to capture Point 4875. A stretch of 30–40 kilometres of the national highway was under direct observation of the enemy. From Point 4875, Pakistani artillery observers could easily see Indian gun positions, army camps and troop movement, and bring down effective artillery fire at will.
 
On 1 July 1999, Major S Vijay Bhaskar, 'A' Company commander and Lt. Col. Joshi, commanding officer of the 13 JAK Rifles, conducted their preliminary reconnaissance, after climbing to a vantage point, and formulated an attack plan. Subsequently, on 2 July, General Officer Commanding 8 Mountain Division, Major General Mohinder Puri and Brigadier Rajesh Kumar Kakkar Commander 79 Mountain Brigades and Lt Col Y.K. Joshi, Commanding Officer 13 JAK Rifles gathered at 79 Mountain Brigades headquarters, to discuss the plan.

The battalion was deployed to firebase, located in a defiladed area, approximately 1500 metres from the Point 4875. Over the two days, on 2 and 3 July, weapons carriers from the 13 JAK Rifles and 28 Rashtriya Rifles dumped ammunition and heavy weapons. During the day of 4 July, the company commanders of 'A' and 'C' Companies, Major S.V. Bhaskar and Major Gurpreet Singh, conducted their final reconnaissance and showed the objectives to their 'O' groups.

At 1800 hours that same day, artillery bombardment of the enemy positions on Point 4875 commenced, and continued throughout the whole night. 155 mm Bofors Howitzers, 105 mm Field Guns, and multi barrel rocket launchers were used in the bombardment of Point 4875. At 2030 hours, under cover of artillery fire, 'A' and 'C' Companies began climbing the Point 4875. Captain Vikram Batra was lying in a sleeping bag near the Mushkoh nullah, and was down with fever and fatigue. His commanding officer had ordered him to rest even though his battalion, 13 JAK Rifles, had launched its attack on Point 4875.

Both the assault companies were leading the offensive from the right flank. The soldiers had to take out enemy pockets of resistance which they encountered en route. However at one point, a strategically located machine gun halted the advance, and by first light the troops were still 50 meters short of the target. Now it was getting dangerous because in daylight, Indian soldiers could easily be seen by the Pakistanis. The attack was also halted by very effective sniper fire from Pakistani soldiers hiding behind rocks.

At 0430 hours, the two companies deployed their automatic weapons and began to fire at the well-fortified enemy positions at the top of the feature. The enemy was bringing down small arms fire and sniper fire, which effectively blocked the advance of the Indian troops. At around 1015 hours on 5 July, the commanding officer of 'C' company spoke to the battalion commanding officer and explained his company's predicament and the area from where the enemy was bringing in fire on them. Brigadier Kakkar was personally supervising operations. At this juncture, the battalion commanding officer, Lt Col Joshi personally fired two Fagot missiles in quick succession from the fire base and neutralized the enemy position. Brigadier Kakkar watched the firing of the missiles through his binoculars. The bunker received a direct hit and the enemy soldiers were seen fleeing from it. The Indian troops then promptly began advancing again. Soon, Company C with two sections, led by Major Gurpreet Singh assaulted the enemy position. By 1300 hours, these troops had captured Point 4875. Subsequently, both 'A' and 'C' Companies linked up. They then consolidated their hold on Point 4875, however the Indian troops continued to receive enemy artillery and machine-gun fire from Pimple 2 and area North of Point 4875.

At 2200 hours on 5 July, from a Pakistani position north of Point 4875, the enemy brought heavy and accurate fire on the two companies. In the early hours of the following morning at 0445 hours, 'C' Company reported they were in a heavy firefight and were running out of ammunition. Company B, the reserve company, promptly brought up the ammunition after which the firefight continued.

The Indian victory would not have been complete without the capture of 'Area Flat Top', an adjacent peak and part of enemy defences on Point 4875. The 13 JAK Rifles had captured Flat top feature of Point 4875 on the afternoon of 5 July after a fierce battle with Pakistani forces. But the enemy launched an immediate counterattack to take back the Area Flat Top they had lost. "Young Captain NA Nagappa was holding Flat Top. He had a small force but he fought ferociously to beat back the offensive. The first counter-attack was beaten back. The Pakistanis too were facing the same problem of climbing, with the Indian Army on top shooting at them. It is not that they did not have the will to do it but the carpet-firing by our troops did not let them come to the top," a 79 Infantry Brigade officer said. There was a seesaw battle taking place at the Area Flat Top. A shell hit Area Flat Top, seriously injuring Captain Naveen Nagappa who was shooting at the advancing Pakistani soldiers. Splinters pierced through both his legs and he fell unconscious. Taking advantage of this situation, the Pakistanis started climbing faster.

Batra, who was observing the situation from base, went to his commanding officer and volunteered. Seeing him unwell, the commanding officer did not want him to go but Batra insisted on it. That same day, the enemy launched a second counterattack on Flat Top and although the Indian troops succeeded in beating back this, too, they urgently needed reinforcements. Several of his battalion's soldiers volunteered to accompany Batra even before any Company could be ordered. 

Just before leaving, Batra along with the 25 men of his Delta Company, who were to accompany him, prayed at the Durga Mata temple. It was pitch black night when they began the climb. Having heard a wireless message from the base that Sher Shah (Batra's code name) was coming, a cheer went up among the Indian soldiers on top. The commander ordered them to hold their ground until Sher Shah arrived and then he would take over.

On the night of 6–7 July, the opposing forces were so close that besides exchanges of small arms fire, verbal exchanges continued throughout the night. It was at this stage where it became imperative for Indian troops to destroy this Pakistani post, located north of Point 4875, from where enemy fire was coming as otherwise the situation could become worse. At this juncture, the Indian troops detected the enemy presence on a long and narrow ledge, running north from Point 4875. On the ledge, the enemy were holding strong sangars echeloned one behind the other. Batra, who was still recovering from his own wounds he received in the battle of Point 5140, wanted to reach the top to rescue his fellow soldiers and carry out reconnaissance of the ledge where the enemy soldiers were. It was pitch dark when they had left at night, but even near the top where the soldiers had to climb vertically, visibility was almost zero because of fog and snow. En route to the top, Batra spotted a Pakistani machine gun position firing at the trapped Indian soldiers. Crouching, he moved toward the machine gun position, hiding behind rocks whenever possible. As he reached close to the enemy's machine gun position he lobbed a grenade, destroying the machine gun position. Before first light on the 7th, the troops succeeded in knocking out two more enemy machine guns, however, firing from the ledge continued. Batra's platoon soon reached the ledge, though by this time it was broad daylight.

At 0530 hours Lt. Col. Joshi spoke to Batra and asked him to reconnoitre the area. Batra, accompanied by Subedar Raghunath Singh and Major Bhat, his artillery observation officer, took out a patrol to recce a route to re-inforce Naveen from a flank. Batra located the position of the enemy sangar on the ledge from which enemy machine guns were holding up the advance of his company. At this juncture, Batra, realizing there was no way from the left or right, decided to make a direct assault in daylight itself. Under heavy fire from enemy machine guns and grenade firing launchers, Batra moved forward, screaming the battle cry of JAK RIF – Durga mata ki jai, and charged the sangar firing incessantly from his AK-47. He sustained grievous injuries in the process, yet he continued his charge, with supporting fire from the rest of the patrol, and upon reaching the very narrow entrance of the sangar and taking the enemy by complete surprise, he killed 5 Pakistani soldiers in a close-quarter battle. The attack resulted in seven Pakistani soldiers killed after which the Indians gained a foothold on the ledge. Taken by surprise by the attack, Pakistanis started retreating. Batra and his men had gained the upper hand by now. Batra pulled out a bleeding Naveen from the bunker. However, there was still an enemy machine gun nest in action on that ledge that had to be silenced. Four Pakistani soldiers including a junior commissioned officer (JCO), who was guiding the fire on the Indian soldiers fighting outside, were manning the machine gun nest. Batra charged forward alone, killing all four members of the crew.

Batra realized one of his men had been shot. He resolved to evacuate him with Subedar Raghunath Singh. Batra exposed himself to enemy fire to drag the injured soldier to safety, and in the process was shot in the chest by an enemy sniper from very close range, and a split-second later, by a splinter from an RPG which hit him in the head. Batra collapsed next to the injured soldier, succumbing to the fatal wounds.

Param Vir Chakra 

Vikram Batra was awarded the Param Vir Chakra, India's highest military honour on 15 August 1999, the 52nd anniversary of India's independence. His father G.L. Batra received the honour for his deceased son from the President of India, the late K. R. Narayanan.

The Param Vir Chakra citation reads as follows:

In popular culture
The 2003 Hindi film LOC: Kargil (based on the entire Kargil conflict) was released under J. P. Films banner. Abhishek Bachchan played the role of Batra.
In the 2021 film Shershaah, Sidharth Malhotra played Batra in a biopic directed by Vishnuvardhan and produced by Dharma Productions and Kaash Entertainment.
A graphic novel titled, Indian War Comics - Capt.Vikram Batra, PVC written by Aditya Bakshi was released in 2008

Legacy

Vikram Batra is also well known in India for using the slogan; Yeh Dil Maange More! as his signal to communicate mission success. He is also known for an interview in which he stated that Pakistani soldiers were aware of him.

He was also honoured with several landmarks being named after him: the historic capture of Point 4875 led to the mountain being named Batra Top in his honour. A hall at the Service Selection Centre Allahabad is named 'Vikram Batra Block', a residential area in the Jabalpur Cantonment is called 'Captain Vikram Batra Enclave' and the combined cadet's mess at the IMA is named 'Vikram Batra Mess'.

A memorial for war veterans including Batra stands at his alma mater DAV College, Chandigarh honouring the services of the soldiers. 

Government College Palampur was later renamed in the memory of Batra. The college is renamed as Shaheed Captain Vikram Batra Government College, Palampur.

New Delhi's Mukarba Chowk and its flyover were renamed in honour of Batra in December 2019 as "Shaheed Captain Vikram Batra Chowk".

Saheed Captain Vikram Batra Stadium at Palampur was named after Batra.

Panjab University, Chandigarh dedicated state of the art Indoor Shooting Range in honour of Captain Vikram Batra. 

The Indian Army paid tribute to Batra on the 21st anniversary of his death in a video posted on its social media account. The video featured Batra's famous words- Yeh dil maange more, and included people of all ages and from all walks of life saying "I am Vikram Batra". 

To commemorate the 22 years of the sacrifice made by Batra, Army Commander Northern Command Lieutenant general Yogesh Kumar Joshi overflew the famous "Batra Top" in a Sukhoi-30 MKI and paid homage to the nation's hero from the sky. Joshi was also the then Commanding Officer of Batra.

A bust of Param Vir Chakra (PVC) Captain Vikram Batra was unveiled at Palampur military station on the eve of R.D '22

URF World Records (Universal Records Forum) certified the largest underwater portrait of Batra on the eve of Kargil Vijay Diwas 26 July 2022 at swimming pool Pangode Military Station,  Thiruvananthapuram, Kerala.

On the occasion of Parakram Diwas, Indian Government announced that its naming 21 largest unnamed islands of Andaman and Nicobar after the 21 Param Vir Chakra awardees. As a Param Vir Chakra Awardee, an island is named after Vikram Batra as Batra Island.

References

Notes

Citations

Bibliography

External links 

 'The Lives and Good Times of a Country.' – India Today
 Captain Vikram Batra said 'ye dil maange more'! – ABP News
 Remembering Vikram Batra: His Twin Tells Us the Tale of Luv & Kush – The Quint

1974 births
1999 deaths
People from Kangra district
Indian Military Academy alumni
Military personnel from Himachal Pradesh
People of the Kargil War
Indian military personnel killed in action
Recipients of the Param Vir Chakra